Winchelsea is an historic town in East Sussex, England. There has been a Mayor of Winchelsea since Edward I granted the town the right to its own Mayor and Corporation around 1292. Records of the Mayors exist since 1295. Since the Mayor has been elected annually on Easter Monday by the Freemen of the Town at an "Hundred".

The corporation lost its remaining civil and judicial powers in 1886 but was preserved as a charity by an Act of Parliament in order to maintain the membership of the Cinque Port Confederation. The mayor and corporation in Winchelsea now have a largely ceremonial role, together with responsibility for the ongoing care and maintenance of the main listed ancient monuments in the town and the Winchelsea museum.

Past Mayors of Winchelsea include:

John Salerne 1407-09 MP for Winchelsea, 1402 and 1407 and Romney, 1386, 1388 and 1391.
Robert Sparrow 1501, 1511, 1517 and 1524 MP for Winchelsea, 1510, ?1512, ?1515 and 1523
Thomas Ashburnham 1509-10 and 1521-2.
George Lowys 1525, 1531, 1536, 1537, 1551 MP for Winchelsea, 1529 and ?1536
John Bell 1535 and 1541 MP for Winchelsea, 1541
Frederick Andrew Inderwick 1892-93, 1902-03
Robert Curteis Stileman 1901-02

21st century
2005–06 John Dunk
2006–07 John Gooders
2007–08 Alan McKinna
2008–09 Anthony Moore
2009–10 Graham Alexander
2010–11 Mike Melvin
2012–13 Roger Neaves
2014–15 Stephen Turner
2015–16 John Spencer
2016–17 John Spencer
2017–18 Cynthia Feast
2018–19 John Rodley
2019–20 John Rodley

References

Winchelsea
Local government in East Sussex
East Sussex-related lists